This is an order of battle for the Battle of Vimeiro that was fought on 20 August 1808.

Abbreviations used

Military rank
 Gen = General
 Lt Gen = Lieutenant-General
 Maj Gen = Major-General 
 GD = général de division
 Brig Gen = Brigadier-General 
 GB = général de brigade
 Col = Colonel
 Lt Col = Lieutenant Colonel
 Maj = Major
 Capt = Captain
 Lt = Lieutenant

Other
 (w) = wounded
 (mw) = mortally wounded
 (k) = killed in action
 (c) = captured

British-Portuguese Army
Commander-in-chief: Lt Gen Sir Arthur Wellesley

French Army of Portugal
Commander-in-chief: General of Division Jean-Andoche Junot, duke of Abrantes

Notes
There is no exact muster of the French Army of Portugal at Vimeiro, so the unit strength is given for the end of the July.  

Sir Charles Oman calculated that the French Army of Portugal at Vimeiro on the day of the battle (20 August) was:

Infantry: 8,305 men
Reserve Grenadiers: 2,100 men
Cavalry: 1,951 men
Artillery and other: 700 men

Total force: 13,056

Sources

Printed
 Zimmermann, Dick. "The Battle of Vimeiro", Wargamer's Digest Magazine. October 1983.

Footnotes

Peninsular War orders of battle